George David Raw (born 14 November 1944) is an English former first-class cricketer.

Raw was born at Ossett in November 1944. He studied at St Catharine's College, Cambridge. While studying at Cambridge, he made his debut in first-class cricket for Cambridge University against Sussex at Fenner's in 1967. He made five further first-class appearances for Cambridge, the last of which coming in 1968 against Leicestershire. He scored 82 runs in his six matches, at an average of 8.20 and a high score of 21. In addition to playing first-class cricket, he also played minor counties cricket for Cambridgeshire in 1968, making eight appearances in the Minor Counties Championship.

References

External links

1944 births
Living people
People from Ossett
Alumni of St Catharine's College, Cambridge
English cricketers
Cambridge University cricketers
Cambridgeshire cricketers